James Mullen (born 16 March 1947) is an English footballer who played as a left winger in the Football League.

References

External links
Jimmy Mullen's Career

1947 births
Living people
English footballers
Footballers from Oxford
Association football midfielders
Charlton Athletic F.C. players
Oxford City F.C. players
Reading F.C. players
Rotherham United F.C. players
Blackburn Rovers F.C. players
Bury F.C. players
Rochdale A.F.C. players
Great Harwood Town F.C. players
English Football League players